Vieques Air Link Flight 901A was a flight from Vieques Airport in Vieques, Puerto Rico, to St. Croix, United States Virgin Islands that crashed on August 2, 1984, killing all nine passengers and crew on board.

Crash
The flight was operated by a Britten-Norman Islander, registration N589SA. After refueling at Vieques Airport, the aircraft took off with one crew member, its pilot, and eight passengers, at 7:55 AM. According to an airport mechanic, the aircraft then lost altitude, the pilot regaining it momentarily before the aircraft banked to its left and nosedived into the Atlantic Ocean.

Investigation
In the course of its investigation the National Transportation Safety Board (NTSB) learned that on March 13, 1984, the young, 21 years old pilot had completed training at a flying school to obtain a commercial pilot's license, but was not qualified to fly as a pilot-in-command of a commuter airliner, being restricted to air charter operations only.

Further investigation revealed that the aircraft's left hand fuel tank had been filled with fuel from an underground tank contaminated with water from previous days of heavy rains, which ultimately caused the No.1 engine to fail.  At the time the engine failed, the aircraft was over the ocean. The pilot attempted to turn the aircraft around; however, he turned in the wrong direction, causing the aircraft to flip and crash into the water.

The aircraft was required to have ten life vests installed. However, the divers who participated in the recovery mission stated that they found no life vests inside the aircraft. The NTSB investigators inspected ten life vests that the airline claimed had been recovered from the wreckage. Four were found to have loose CO₂ gas cylinders, used for inflation of the vests. The Federal Aviation Administration (FAA) later examined all of Vieques Air Link's life vests and found that about 40 percent of them had loose inflation cylinders.

Furthermore, it was also discovered that the aircraft's safety cards depicted a Britten-Norman Trislander, not an Islander;  and that the card incorrectly showed the location of the inflation toggle and mouthpiece of the life vest type used by the airline.

Autopsies revealed that the pilot and three passengers died as a result of impact injuries; the five other passengers also had impact injuries but had drowned.

Recommendations
The NTSB issued a list of recommendations in July, 1985, after investigation of this air accident.

Pilatus-Britten Norman needed to prepare and disseminate a safety advisory to airlines and owners concerning water in fuel tanks on their aircraft.
Airlines using Britten-Norman aircraft have to check for contamination of fuel before each aircraft's first flight of the day and after refuelling the aircraft.
Have all Eastern Aero Marine Model G-12 life-vests checked before using, paying particular attention to CO₂ cylinders and Technical Standard Order labelling.

See also
Pan Am Flight 526A
US Airways Flight 1549
Dominicana DC-9 air disaster

References

External links
 

Airliner accidents and incidents in Puerto Rico
Airliner accidents and incidents caused by engine failure
Accidents and incidents involving the Britten-Norman Islander
Aviation accidents and incidents in the United States in 1984
Aviation accidents and incidents in Puerto Rico
Aviation accidents and incidents caused by pilot error
Vieques Air Link accidents and incidents
1984 in Puerto Rico
August 1984 events in North America